The 1984 NAIA Men's Ice Hockey Tournament involved four schools playing in single-elimination bracket to determine the national champion of men's NAIA college ice hockey. The 1984 tournament was the 17th men's ice hockey tournament to be sponsored by the NAIA.   The tournament began on March 1, 1983 and ended with the championship game on March 2, 1983.

The 1984 tournament marked the last season that the NAIA sponsored the sport of men's ice hockey at the championship level. A mass-exodus of schools to NCAA Division II and the creation of the Division III men's hockey championship further led to the decline of NAIA Hockey in the decade.

Bracket
Hobbs Municipal Ice Center, Eau Claire, Wisconsin

Note: * denotes overtime period(s)

References

External links 
 NAIA ice hockey

Ice
NAIA Men's Ice Hockey Championship
NAIA Ice Hockey Championship 
NAIA Ice Hockey Championship